A timeline of notable events relating to the BBC News Channel and its original name BBC News 24.

1990s
1991
17 January–2 March – Radio 4 News FM, the first rolling BBC radio news service produced by the BBC, is on air during the first Gulf War. It broadcasts on BBC Radio 4’s FM frequencies with the regular scheduled service continuing on long wave.

1992
No events.

1993
Following the success of Radio 4 News FM and of a similar service on Long Wave during the 1992 UK general election, the BBC considers launching a rolling news service on Radio 4's long wave frequency. The plan is widely opposed by listeners and the proposals are dropped.

1994
28 March – BBC Radio 5 Live launches as the BBC's first full time rolling news service.

1995
16 January – BBC World launches, becoming the BBC's first television rolling news service, although it is an international service and is not available to viewers in the UK.

1996
No events.

1997
9 November – BBC News 24 launches at 5:30pm. The full channel is only available on cable although all viewers are able to sample the channel overnight as BBC News 24 is simulcast during the downtime hours of BBC One.

1998
Spring – BBC News 24 begins simulcasting overnight news bulletins from BBC World.
1 October – Sky Digital launches and BBC News 24 is carried as part of the new service. This is the first time that satellite viewers are able to see a full-time feed of the BBC's rolling news service.
15 November – The public launch of digital terrestrial TV in the UK takes place and BBC News 24 launches on the new service.

1999
25 October –  Relaunch of BBC News 24 with a new set design, known as 'Red and Cream'.

2000s
2000
6 April – Click launches as a weekly weekend programme covering the latest developments in the world of technology and the internet.
29 September – The final edition of Breakfast 24 is broadcast ahead of a decision to end separate breakfast programmes for BBC One and News 24.
2 October – The first edition of BBC Breakfast is broadcast, the new morning show on BBC One and News 24 from 6:00am–9:30am. (9:00am on BBC News 24).

2001
11 September – The 9/11 attacks occur in the United States and are broadcast live on television. BBC1 abandons regular programming and switches to BBC News 24. This is the first time that BBC One switches to News 24 for coverage of a breaking news story during daytime hours.

2002
No events.

2003
20 March – As the 2003 invasion of Iraq begins BBC News 24 is carried on both BBC One and BBC Two to keep viewers up to date with the latest developments. 
8 December – BBC News 24 is relaunched with a new set and titles, as well as a new Breaking News sting.

 2004
 1 October – Right-of-reply programme Newswatch launches in response to the Hutton Inquiry, as part of an initiative to make BBC News more accountable.

2005
 No events.

2006
30 January – The BBC News at Ten begins being simulcast on News 24. 
3 April – The BBC News at Five is broadcast for the first time.
10 April – The BBC News at One (with British Sign Language in-vision signing) and BBC News at Six begins being seen on BBC News apart from during breaking news coverage.
May – STORYFix is broadcast for the first time. The programmes takes took a mildly satirical view of the week's events – although the satire was aimed more at the way the news was reported than at the news itself.
25 November – The first edition of a new user-generated programme, Your News, is broadcast.

2007
22 January – BBC News 24 is relaunched with new titles and new astons.
 May – BBC News 24 starts being simulcast on the BBC News website.
 27 July – STORYFix is broadcast for the final time, ending because the programme had been seen as being part of a video podcasting trial, and that the production team 'will be moving on to other projects'.

 2008
 21 April – BBC News undergoes a uniform rebrand which costs £550,000. BBC News 24 is renamed BBC News while BBC World is renamed as BBC World News.
20/21 December – The final edition of Your News is broadcast.

 2009
No events.

2010s
2010
No events.

2011
No events.

2012
25 October – Following the completion of digital switchover in the UK, the BBC News Channel is available to all UK households for the first time, almost fifteen years after the channel first launched.

2013
18 March – The channel's idents are updated on the same day that BBC News relocates to the refurbished Broadcasting House.
March – The business updates are axed as part of the BBC's Delivering Quality First plan.
November – The axed business news updates are restored following complaints over their removal.
10 December – BBC News launches a high definition version of the channel.
The Papers is broadcast for the first time.

2014
14 February – The first edition of The Travel Show is broadcast.

2015
7 April – BBC News launches a new two-hour weekday current affairs programme called The Victoria Derbyshire Show. The programme is broadcast on both BBC Two and the BBC News Channel; 
1 June – BBC ‘World News programmes Outside Source and Business Live make their debut on the BBC News Channel. They appear as a result of cutbacks which also sees the overnight simulcast of BBC World News beginning an hour earlier at midnight.
6 June – World News Today is included in the weekend schedule of the BBC News Channel for the first time, airing at 9:00.

2016
February – The BBC News Channel briefly begins showing Newsnight, delayed by 45 minutes from the live BBC Two broadcast.
 21 March – The two-hour slot between 11am and 1pm on weekdays is relaunched as BBC Newsroom Live.

2017
January – 100 Days, later rebranded to Beyond 100 Days, launches. Its main focus is on American news and politics and is co-presented from London and Washington.
2 October – The first edition of Afternoon Live is broadcast.

2018
No events.
2019

19 February – Virgin Media removes the standard definition versions of the non-flagship BBC television channels, including BBC News.
15 July – A new set of graphics and fonts are launched. They use the BBC Reith typeface which uses larger text, designed to make it easier for Smartphone and Tablet users to read.

2020s
2020
13 March – The final edition of The Victoria Derbyshire Show is broadcast in order to focus on coverage of the COVID-19 pandemic. The UK Government's daily press conference on the pandemic was broadcast in place of BBC News at Five on the BBC News Channel, and also on BBC One.
17 March – The final edition of The Victoria Derbyshire Show is broadcast in order to focus on coverage of the COVID-19 pandemic. The programme had been due to come off air later in 2020 due to funding cuts.
The COVID-19 pandemic results in an increase of simulcasts between BBC News and BBC World News with simulcasting now running through the morning (10am to 1pm) and the evening (7pm to 10pm). UK-only rolling news coverage is restricted to the afternoons. Individually-titled programmes are also suspended in favour of the generic BBC News term.
August – The additional simulcasts with BBC World News are made permanent. Consequently, the two channels now simulcast between 10am and 12pm each day, as well as from 7pm to 6am on weekdays, with opt-outs for BBC News at Ten and for half an hour at 8:30pm and between 9pm to 6am, apart from the evening BBC One bulletin, during the weekend.

2021
9 April – At just after midday, Buckingham Palace announces the death of Prince Philip and BBC One, BBC Two, BBC Parliament and BBC World News switch over to BBC News to announce the death. The message was likely received during the top-of-the hour headlines, as the wide-shot in the opening featured multiple journalists running across the room.

2022
10 January – A new 60-minute discussion-based programme Context is launched. It broadcasts from Mondays to Thursdays on BBC News and BBC World News and features two guests discussing the day's news.
 14 July – The BBC sets out plans for a new global news channel titled BBC News. It will replace its two existing news services for the UK and overseas. It is scheduled to launch in April 2023.
 October – The Friday teatime Film Review segment ends after many years.

2023
2 January – The BBC News channel airs the final edition of The Papers, its nightly review of the following morning's newspaper headlines. From the following day, discussion of newspaper headlines forms part of its news content. However, the Sunday Morning opt-out from BBC World News remains on-air at 09:30am
7 January – Ahead of the merger in April, the BBC News Channel stops producing its weekend opt-out from BBC World News between 13:00-19:00 and network news bulletins, apart from Breakfast and Sunday with Laura Kuenssberg, stop being simulcast on the channel.
2 February – The BBC announces that Matthew Amroliwala, Christian Fraser, Yalda Hakim, Lucy Hockings, and Maryam Moshiri will be chief presenters on the BBC’s news channel. However Amroliwala's' Global, Hakim's Impact and Live With Lucy Hockings are not confirmed as staying on air.
 6 March – World Business Report begins to be shown on the BBC News Channel as part of extended programme sharing between the channel and BBC World News.
 3 April – The BBC News Channel will close as a stand-alone UK channel when it is merged with BBC World News. The new single channel will be called BBC News with programmes based on BBC World News output although the ability to break away from international programming for a major UK news story is to be retained and the weekday simulcasts of the BBC One news bulletins will be retained.
April – Nicky Campbell's BBC Radio 5 Live weekday morning show will start to be simulcast on BBC Two and BBC News.

See also
Timeline of BBC Television News

References

Television in the United Kingdom by year
BBC television timelines
United Kingdom news broadcasting timelines